The Treasury of the Boeotians was dedicated in the late Archaic period within the sanctuary of Apollo at Delphi. It is identified due to some epigraphic material.

Description
Towards the southwestern end of the Sacred Way in the sanctuary of Apollo at Delphi are located the foundations of a treasury which is identified to that dedicated by the Boeotians. Pausanias does not mention this particular building, thus it is possible that it has been destroyed by his time.  The architectural parts that are still extant indicate that it was a Doric building made of limestone on which inscriptions in the Boeotian writing style of the Late Archaic period have been preserved. According to these inscriptions, the building is dated to ca 525 B.C.

Bibliography
Bommelaer, J.-F., Laroche, D.,1991, Guide de Delphes. Le site, Sites et Monuments 7, Paris, 128
De la Coste Messelière, P.,1936,Au Musée des Delphes, Paris, Paris, pp. 469, 474.    
Partida, E., 2000, The Treasures at Delphi, an Architectural Study, Jonsered 2000, 192-198. 
Partida, E., 2000, “Two Boeotian Treasures at Delphi”, in Αραβαντινός, Β. (ed.), Επετηρίς Εταιρείας Βοιωτικών Μελετών, 3, Αθήνα, pp. 536–564.

References

Ancient Greek buildings and structures in Delphi
525 BC
Buildings and structures completed in the 6th century BC
Ancient Boeotia